Jennifer Lasimbang is a Malaysian politician from Sabah. In Sabah government, she has been the State Assistant Minister of Education and Innovation. She served as the Member of Sabah State Legislative Assembly (MLA) for Moyog from May 2018 until September 2020. She is a member of the Sabah Heritage Party (WARISAN).

Election results

References

Malaysian politicians
Living people
1974 births